Hadromeros is an extinct genus of trilobite in the order Phacopida.

References

External links
 Hadromeros at the Paleobiology Database

Cheiruridae
Fossils of Ireland
Fossils of Great Britain
Silurian trilobites
Paleozoic life of the Northwest Territories
Paleozoic life of Quebec
Phacopida genera